Drača  is a village in the municipality of Stanovo, Serbia. According to the preliminary results of the 2011 census, the village has a population of 911 people. In the domain of the village, cca 7 kilometres from the centre of the city of Kragujevac, the geographical centre of Serbia is located.

References

Populated places in Šumadija District
Geographical centres